Billingham Rugby Union Football Club is a rugby union club in the world based in Billingham in North East England, with the club playing their 1st XV matches in North Premier. The club also has a strong youth contingent, picking up many honours within previous years. Billingham play their home matches at Greenwood Road, the home of the club which has top of the range facilities. Billingham Rugby Union Football Club has four senior teams, the 1st XV currently playing in National 3 North, four leagues from the Premiership. The 2nd XV (Lions) play in The "Candy League" Division 1. The 3rd XV play in The "Candy League" Division 2. and the Colts play in a Saturday Colts League. The club has a promising junior section ranging from u-7 minis to u-16's with teams winning Durham county cups and leagues. Players who have come through the junior section have gone on to higher levels. Christopher Hyndman, playing for England under-21s and Northampton Saints with Craig Willis and Adam Radwan playing for England and Newcastle Falcons.

History
Billingham Rugby Club was formed in 1924 as the rugby section of the Synthonia Sports Club at Synthetic Ammonia and Nitrates Company, which later became Imperial Chemical Industries (ICI). Once established, the club became a force in Durham County Rugby Union, especially after the Second World War and the first team was very strong during the 1950s and early 1960s.

The early 1970s saw a downturn in the chemical industry and with the decline of ICI, the rugby club suffered. In the late 1970s and throughout the 1980s the club became somewhat nomadic in its socialising, although still playing on Central Avenue.

1989 was an important year in the life of the club. The youth section was founded and boys and girls from the age of eight upwards playing mini-rugby.  Since then, this section of the club has gone from strength to strength and has provided several current members of the first XV squad.

The 1990s saw an upturn in the club's fortunes and three teams were regularly playing each week with socialising based at the Synthonia Cricket Club.

The club moved to play on Greenwood Road in 1996 although until late 2000 there were no facilities whatsoever, just three pitches.  For these years we had a three-site existence, changing, playing and socialising in different locations.

However, December 2000 and a £750,000 lottery grant brought the opening of the new clubhouse giving the club a solid base and identity and we hope that it will serve as a stepping-stone to future success.

In August 2021, former Billingham player Jack Smith won a gold medal as a member of Great Britain national wheelchair rugby team at the 2020 Summer Paralympics in Tokyo.

Honours
 Durham/Northumberland 3 Champions (2): 1993–94, 1996–97
 Durham/Northumberland 2 Champions: 1997–98
 Durham/Northumberland 1 Champions: 2007–08
 North Division 1 East champions (2): 2009–10, 2011–12
 Regional 1 North East Champions: 2022-23

References

English rugby union teams
Rugby clubs established in 1924
Sport in County Durham
Billingham
Sport in the Borough of Stockton-on-Tees